Great Britain competed at the 2013 World Aquatics Championships in Barcelona, Spain from 19 July to 4 August 2013.

Medalists

Diving

Men

Women

High diving

Great Britain has qualified three high divers.

Open water swimming
Great Britain has qualified the following open water swimmers.

Swimming

Swimmers from Great Britain earned qualifying standards in the following events (up to a maximum of 2 swimmers in each event at the A-standard entry time, and 1 at the B-standard): A total of 27 swimmers (16 men and 11 women) were selected to the team.

Men

Women

Synchronized swimming

Great Britain has qualified the following synchronized swimmers.

Water polo

Women's tournament

Team roster

Rosemary Morris
Chloe Wilcox
Fiona McCann
Ciara Gibson-Byrne
Aine Hoy
Claire Nixon
Lisa Gibson
Hazel Musgrove
Peggy Etiebet
Angela Winstanley-Smith
Francesca Clayton
Kathryn Fowler
Jade Smith

Group play

Round of 16

References

External links
Barcelona 2013 Official Site

Nations at the 2013 World Aquatics Championships
World Aquatics Championships
Great Britain at the World Aquatics Championships